Berkeley School District 87 is a school district headquartered in Berkeley, Illinois. The school district comprises six schools.

It was established in 1848.

Schools

Information based on 2017-18 Illinois Report Cards.

References

External links
 Berkeley School District 87

School districts in Cook County, Illinois
1848 establishments in Illinois
School districts established in 1848